Kout na Šumavě is a municipality and village in Domažlice District in the Plzeň Region of the Czech Republic. It has about 1,100 inhabitants.

Administrative parts
Villages of Nový Dvůr and Starý Dvůr are administrative parts of Kout na Šumavě.

References

Villages in Domažlice District